Jim Courier and Mark Knowles were the defending champions, but lost in semifinals to Byron Black and Jonathan Stark.

Byron Black and Jonathan Stark won the title by defeating Patrick McEnroe and Jared Palmer 6–4, 6–4 in the final.

Seeds
The first four seeds received a bye into the second round.

Draw

Finals

Top half

Bottom half

References
 Official results archive (ATP)
 Official results archive (ITF)

Men's Doubles